Metro3D, Inc. (formerly Metropolis Digital, Inc.)  was an American video game developer and publisher. Based in San Jose, California, and founded in 1998 , the company released several games for the Dreamcast, Game Boy Color (GBC), Game Boy Advance (GBA), and PlayStation 2 (PS2) consoles.

In 1998, the developer began seeking beta testers for its new online game Armada. On April 27, 1999, the company, headed by ex-Capcom employees Joe Morici and George Nakayama, renamed itself Metro3D, Inc. after signing an agreement with Nintendo of America to become a third-party developer for Nintendo 64 and GBC games.

The company's CEO, Dr. Stephen C. H. Lin, and the U.S. branch of the company filed Chapter 11 bankruptcy on April 19, 2004, after defaulting on a series of loans from Cathay Bank totaling $6.5 million. The company's European division was sold off in June 2005 to Stewart Green of Green Solutions Limited (the parent of Data Design Interactive), but continued to operate in the region.

Games 
Aero the Acro-Bat (GBA, 2002)
Aero the Acro-Bat 2 (GBA, unpublished)
Armada (Dreamcast, 1999)
Armada II (Dreamcast, Xbox, PS2, unpublished)
Armada F/X Racers (GBC, 2000)
Chase H.Q.: Secret Police (GBC, 1999)
Classic Bubble Bobble (GBC, 1999)
The Cage (GBC, unpublished)
Dark Angel: Vampire Apocalypse (PS2, 2001)
Dark Angel II (PS2, unpublished)
Dark Angel: Anna's Quest (GBC, unpublished)
Defender of the Crown (GBA, 2002)
Dinosaur Hunting (released in Japan, unpublished in North America by Metro3D)
DroneZ (Xbox, 2004, released in Japan as Dennou Taisen ~ DroneZ ~, unpublished in North America by Metro3D)
Dual Blades (GBA, 2002)
Gem Smashers (GBA, 2003)
Maxxis Ultimate ATV (Xbox, unpublished)
Pumpkin Man (Xbox, unpublished)
Puzzle Master (GBC, 1999)
Ninja (GBC, unpublished)
Shayde: Monsters vs. Humans (Xbox, unpublished)
Smash Cars (PS2, 2003)
Stake: Fortune Fighters (Xbox, 2003)
Star Command: Revolution (PC, 1996, as Metropolis Digital, Inc.)
Sub Rebellion (PS2, 2002)
The Three Stooges (GBA, 2002)
Threat Con Delta (PS2, 2004, released in Japan as Kyoushuu Kidou Butai: Kougeki Helicopter Senki, unpublished in North America by Metro3D)
Wings (GBA, 2003)
King's Field IV (PS2, 2003) (European distribution only)
Zero the Kamikaze Squirrel (GBA, unpublished)

References 

Defunct companies based in the San Francisco Bay Area
Video game companies established in 1998
Video game companies disestablished in 2004
Companies that filed for Chapter 11 bankruptcy in 2004
Defunct video game companies of the United States
Video game development companies
1998 establishments in California
2004 disestablishments in California